Silvio Pellico (24 June 1789 – 31 January 1854) was an Italian writer, poet, dramatist and patriot active in the Italian unification.

Biography
Silvio Pellico was born in Saluzzo (Piedmont). He spent the earlier portion of his life at Pinerolo and Turin, under the tuition of a priest named Manavella. At the age of ten he composed a tragedy inspired by a translation of the Ossianic poems. On the marriage of his twin sister Rosina with a maternal cousin at Lyon, he went to reside in that city, devoting himself during four years to the study of French literature. He returned in 1810 to Milan, where he became professor of French in the Collegio degli Orfani Militari, now the Scuola Militare Teulié.

His tragedy Francesca da Rimini was brought out with success by Carlotta Marchionni at Milan in 1818. Its publication was followed by that of the tragedy Euphemio da Messina, but the representation of the latter was forbidden.

Pellico had in the meantime continued his work as tutor, first to the unfortunate son of Count Briche, and then to the two sons of Count . He threw himself heartily into an attempt to weaken the hold of the Austrian despotism by indirect educational means.

The Conciliatore, a review, appeared in 1818. Of the powerful literary executives that gathered about Counts Porro and Confalonieri, Pellico was the able secretary on whom most of the responsibility for the review, the organ of the association, fell. However, the paper, under the censorship of the Austrian officials, ran for a year only, and the society itself was broken up by the government. In October 1820, Pellico was arrested on the charge of carbonarism and conveyed to the Santa Margherita prison. After his removal to the Piombi at Venice in February 1821, he composed several Cantiche and the tragedies Ester d'Engaddi and Iginici d'Asti.

The sentence of death pronounced on him in February 1822 was finally commuted to fifteen years of jail in harsh condition, and in the following April he was placed in the Spielberg, at Brünn (today's Brno), where he was transferred via Udine and Ljubljana. His chief work during this part of his imprisonment was the tragedy Leoniero da Dertona, for the preservation of which he was compelled to rely on his memory.

After his release in 1830, he commenced the publication of his prison compositions, of which the Ester was played at Turin in 1831, but immediately suppressed. In 1832, his Gismonda da Mendrisio, Erodiade and the Leoniero, appeared under the title of Tre nuove tragedie, and in the same year the work which gave him his European fame, an account of his sufferings in prison. The last gained him the friendship of the Marchesa Juliette Colbert de Barolo, the reformer of the Turin prisons, and in 1834 he accepted from her a yearly pension of 1200 francs. His tragedy Tommaso Moro had been published in 1833, his most important subsequent publication being the Opere inedite in 1837. 

On the decease of his parents in 1838, he was received into the Casa Barolo, where he remained until his death, assisting the marchesa in her charities, and writing chiefly upon religious themes. Of these works the best known is the Dei doveri degli uomini, a series of trite maxims which do honor to his piety rather than to his critical judgment. A fragmentary biography of the marchesa by Pellico was published in Italian and English after her death.

He died in 1854 at Turin. He was buried in the Camposanto, Turin.

The simple narrative and naive egotism of Le mie prigioni has established his strongest claim to remembrance, winning fame by his misfortunes rather than by his genius. The late nineteenth century English novelist George Gissing read the work, in Italian, whilst staying in Naples in November 1888. My prisons contributed to the Italian unification against Austrian occupation. The pamphlet was translated into virtually every European language during Pellico's lifetime.

In popular culture
Silvio Pellico gave his name to a little community (1,500 inhabitants) founded in Argentina by Italian immigrants from Saluzzo.

Main works

References

Further reading
 
 
Garofalo, Piero, "Silvio Pellico and Risorgimento." Rivista di Studi Italiani 29.2 (2011): 19–50.
 Gavriel Shapiro, "Nabokov and Pellico: Invitation to a Beheading and My Prisons." Comparative Literature 62#1 (2010): 55–67.

External links 

 
 
 Silvio Pellico Poems

1789 births
1854 deaths
Italian dramatists and playwrights
Italian people of the Italian unification
Carbonari
People from Saluzzo
Italian male dramatists and playwrights
People of Apulian descent